Exephanes is a genus of parasitoid wasps belonging to the family Ichneumonidae.

The species of this genus are found in Europe and Northern America.

Species:
 Exephanes californicus Heinrich, 1961 
 Exephanes deliquus (Kokujev, 1909)

References

Ichneumonidae
Ichneumonidae genera